Cevdet Yılmaz (born 1 April 1967) is a Turkish politician who served as a Deputy Prime Minister of Turkey in the interim election government formed by Prime Minister Ahmet Davutoğlu from 28 August to 17 November 2015. He previously served as the Minister of Development from 2011 to 2015 and again from 2015 to 2016.

After completing high school in Bingöl in 1983, Yılmaz graduated from the Middle East Technical University's Faculty of Economics and Administrative Sciences, Department of Public Administration with honors in 1988. In 1989, he started working at the State Planning Organization.

Yılmaz went to the United States between 1992 and 1994, and graduated from the International Relations Department at the University of Denver. At the Bilkent University's Department of Political Science and Public Administration, Yılmaz received a doctorate. In 2003, Yılmaz was appointed for the Directorate General of EU Relations.

In the elections of 2007, Yılmaz was elected as deputy of Bingöl. On 1 May 2009 he was appointed as the State Minister in the second cabinet of Erdoğan. On 6 July 2011 Yılmaz became Minister of Development in the third cabinet of Erdoğan.

He is of Zaza descent.

References

External links 

  Ministry of Development official web site
  Minister of Development official web site
  Bakanı Biography of Cevdet Yılmaz at the website of AK Party

1967 births
Living people
People from Bingöl
Zaza people
Justice and Development Party (Turkey) politicians
Government ministers of Turkey
Deputies of Bingöl
Middle East Technical University alumni
University of Denver alumni
Bilkent University alumni
Members of the 25th Parliament of Turkey
Members of the 24th Parliament of Turkey
Members of the 23rd Parliament of Turkey
Members of the 63rd government of Turkey
Members of the 26th Parliament of Turkey
Members of the 64th government of Turkey
Deputy Prime Ministers of Turkey
Ministers of Development (Turkey)
Ministers of State of Turkey
Members of the 60th government of Turkey